Villingsberg's shooting range is a military training field outside Villingsberg in Sweden, between Örebro in Karlskoga and Nora in Kilsbergen, on the border between Närke and Värmland. The range extends north-east and is located in close proximity to Bofors Test Center.

The 2019 IPSC Rifle World Shoot was hosted at the range from 3 to 10 August.

Gallery

External links 
Villingsberg's training and shooting field, on the Swedish Defense Forces website
Online bulletin board for the shooting range

References 

Shooting ranges in Sweden
Sports venues in Sweden
Buildings and structures in Karlskoga Municipality